Nowy Młyn  is a village in the administrative district of Gmina Świecie nad Osą, within Grudziądz County, Kuyavian-Pomeranian Voivodeship, in north-central Poland.

The village has a population of 40.

History
During the German occupation of Poland (World War II), Nowy Młyn was one of the sites of executions of Poles, carried out by the Germans in 1939 as part of the Intelligenzaktion.

References

Villages in Grudziądz County